Elif Shafak  (born 25 October 1971) is a Turkish-British novelist, essayist, public speaker, political scientist and activist.

Shafak writes in Turkish and English, and has published 19 works. She is best known for her novels, which include The Bastard of Istanbul, The Forty Rules of Love, Three Daughters of Eve and 10 Minutes 38 Seconds in This Strange World. Her books have been translated into 55 languages and been nominated for several literary awards. Described by the Financial Times as "Turkey's leading female novelist", several of her works have been bestsellers in Turkey and internationally.

Her works have prominently featured the city of Istanbul, and dealt with themes of Eastern and Western culture, roles of women in society, and human rights issues. Certain politically challenging topics addressed in her novels, such as child abuse and the Armenian genocide, have led to legal action from authorities in Turkey that prompted her to emigrate to the United Kingdom.

Shafak has a PhD in political science. An essayist and contributor to several media outlets, Shafak has advocated for women's rights, minority rights, and freedom of speech.

Early life and education
Shafak was born in Strasbourg, France, to Nuri Bilgin, a philosopher, and Şafak Atayman, who later became a diplomat. After her parents separated, Shafak returned to Ankara, Turkey, where she was raised by her mother and maternal grandmother. She says that growing up in a dysfunctional family was difficult, but that growing up in a non-patriarchal environment had a beneficial impact on her. Having grown up without her father, she met her half-brothers for the first time when she was in her mid-twenties.

Shafak added her mother's first name, Turkish for "dawn", to her own when constructing her pen name at the age of eighteen. Shafak spent her teenage years in Madrid, Jordan and Germany.

Shafak studied an undergraduate degree in international relations at Middle East Technical University, and earned a Master's studies in women's studies. She holds a Ph.D. in political science.   She has taught at universities in Turkey. Later emigrating to the United States, she was a fellow at Mount Holyoke College, a visiting professor at the University of Michigan, and was a tenured professor at the University of Arizona in Near Eastern studies.

In the UK, she held the Weidenfeld Visiting Professorship in Comparative European Literature at St Anne's College, University of Oxford, for the 2017–2018 academic year, where she is an honorary fellow.

Career
Shafak has published nineteen books, both fiction and nonfiction.

Fiction
Shafak's first novel, Pinhan, was awarded the Rumi Prize in 1998, a Turkish literary prize.

Shafak's 1999 novel Mahrem (The Gaze) was awarded "Best Novel" by the Turkish Authors' Association in 2000.

Her next novel, Bit Palas (The Flea Palace, 2002), was shortlisted for Independent Best Foreign Fiction in 2005.

Shafak released her first novel in English, The Saint of Incipient Insanities, in 2004.

Her second novel in English, The Bastard of Istanbul, was long-listed for the Orange Prize. It addresses the Armenian genocide, which is denied by the Turkish government. Shafak was prosecuted in July 2006 on charges of "insulting Turkishness" (Article 301 of the Turkish Penal Code) for discussing the genocide in the novel. Had she been convicted, she would have faced a maximum prison sentence of three years. The Guardian commented that The Bastard of Istanbul may be the first Turkish novel to address the genocide. She was acquitted of these charges in September 2006 at the prosecutor's request.

Shafak's novel The Forty Rules of Love (Aşk in Turkish) became a bestseller in Turkey upon its release; it sold more than 200,000 copies by 2009, surpassing a previous record of 120,000 copies set by Orhan Pamuk's The New Life. In France, it was awarded a Prix ALEF* – Mention Spéciale Littérature Etrangère. It was also nominated for the 2012 International IMPAC Dublin Literary Award. In 2019, it was listed by the BBC as one of the 100 "most inspiring" novels and one of the "100 novels that shaped our world".

Her 2012 novel Honour, which focuses on an honour killing, was nominated for the 2012 Man Asian Literary Prize and 2013 Women's Prize for Fiction, followed by The Architect's Apprentice, a historical fiction novel about a fictional apprentice to Mimar Sinan, in 2014.

Her novel Three Daughters of Eve (2017), set in Istanbul and Oxford from the 1980s to the present day was chosen by London Mayor Sadiq Khan as his favorite book of the year. American writer Siri Hustvedt also praised the book. The book explores themes of secular versus orthodox religious practice, conservative versus liberal politics and modern Turkish attitudes towards these .

Following Margaret Atwood, David Mitchell and Sjon, Shafak was selected as the 2017 writer for the Future Library project. Her work The Last Taboo is the third part of a collection of 100 literary works that will not be published until 2114.

Shafak's 2019 novel 10 Minutes 38 Seconds in This Strange World, revolving around the life of an Istanbul sex worker, was shortlisted for the Booker Prize. In 2019, Shafak was investigated by Turkish prosecutors for addressing child abuse and sexual violence in her fiction writing.

Shafak released her twelfth novel The Island of Missing Trees in 2021.

Non-fiction
Shafak's non-fiction essays in Turkish have been collected in four books: Med-Cezir (2005), Firarperest (2010), Şemspare (2012) and Sanma ki Yalnızsın (2017).

In 2020, Shafak published How to Stay Sane in an Age of Division.

In the media
Shafak has written for Time, The Guardian, La Repubblica, The New Yorker, The New York Times, Der Spiegel and New Statesman.

Shafak has been a panellist or commentator on BBC World, Euronews and Al Jazeera English.

In July 2017, Elif Shafak was chosen as a "castaway" on BBC Radio 4's Desert Island Discs.

Shafak has been a TEDGlobal speaker three times.

Themes

Istanbul
Istanbul has been prominent in Shafak's writing. She depicts the city as a melting pot of different cultures and various contradictions. Shafak has remarked: "Istanbul makes one comprehend, perhaps not intellectually but intuitively, that East and West are ultimately imaginary concepts, and can thereby be de-imagined and re-imagined." In the same essay written for Time magazine Shafak says: "East and West is no water and oil. They do mix. And in a city like Istanbul they mix intensely, incessantly, amazingly." The New York Times Book Review said of Shafak, "she has a particular genius for depicting backstreet Istanbul, where the myriad cultures of the Ottoman Empire are still in tangled evidence on every family tree."

In a piece she wrote for the BBC, Shafak said, "Istanbul is like a huge, colourful Matrushka – you open it and find another doll inside. You open that, only to see a new doll nesting. It is a hall of mirrors where nothing is quite what it seems. One should be cautious when using categories to talk about Istanbul. If there is one thing the city doesn't like, it is clichés."

Eastern and Western cultures
Shafak blends Eastern and Western ways of storytelling, and draws on oral and written culture. In The Washington Post, Ron Charles says, "Shafak speaks in a multivalent voice that captures the roiling tides of diverse cultures." Mysticism and specifically Sufism has also been a theme in her work, particularly in The Forty Rules of Love.

Feminism
A feminist and advocate for gender equality, Shafak's writing has addressed numerous feminist issues and the role of women in society. Examples include motherhood and violence against women. In an interview with William Skidelsky for The Guardian, she said: "In Turkey, men write and women read. I want to see this change."

Human rights 
Shafak's novels have explored human rights issues, particularly those in Turkey. She has said "What literature tries to do is to re-humanize people who have been dehumanized ... People whose voices we never hear. That's a big part of my work". Specific topics have included persecution of Yazidis, the Armenian genocide and the treatment of various minorities in Turkey.

Views

Freedom of speech
Shafak is an advocate for freedom of expression. While taking part in the Free Speech Debate, she commented, "I am more interested in showing the things we have in common as fellow human beings, sharing the same planet and ultimately, the same sorrows and joys rather than adding yet another brick in the imaginary walls erected between cultures/religions/ethnicities."

Political views
Shafak has been critical of the presidency of Recep Tayyip Erdoğan, describing his tenure as leading to increased authoritarianism in Turkey. She signed an open letter in protest against Turkey's Twitter ban in 2014, commenting: "the very core of democracy ... is lacking in today's Turkey".

Shafak has spoken and written about various global political trends. In the 2010s, she drew parallels between Turkish political history and political developments in Europe and the United States. Writing in The New Yorker in 2016, she said "Wave after wave of nationalism, isolationism, and tribalism have hit the shores of countries across Europe, and they have reached the United States. Jingoism and xenophobia are on the rise. It is an Age of Angst—and it is a short step from angst to anger and from anger to aggression."

Shafak signed an open letter in protest against Russian persecution of homosexuals and blasphemy laws before Sochi 2014.

Personal life
Shafak had lived  in Istanbul, and in the United States before moving to the UK. Shafak has lived in London since 2013, but speaks of "carrying Istanbul in her soul". As of 2019, Shafak had been in self-imposed exile from Turkey due to fear of prosecution.

Shafak is married to the Turkish journalist Eyüp Can Sağlık, a former editor of the newspaper Radikal, with whom she has a daughter and a son. In 2017, Shafak came out as bisexual.

Following the birth of her daughter in 2006, Shafak suffered from postnatal depression, a period she addressed in her memoir Black Milk.

Awards and recognition

Book awards

 Pinhan, The Great Rumi Award, Turkey 1998.
 The Gaze, Union of Turkish Writers' Best Novel Prize, 2000; and
 The Flea Palace, shortlisted for Independent Foreign Fiction Prize, United Kingdom 2005;
 Soufi, mon amour (Phébus, 2011), Prix ALEF – Mention Spéciale Littérature Etrangère;
 The Forty Rules of Love, nominated for 2012 International IMPAC Dublin Literary Award;
 Crime d'honneur (Phébus, 2013), 2013 Prix Relay des voyageurs;
 Honour, second place for the Prix Escapade, France 2014;
 The Architect's Apprentice, shortlisted for RSL Ondaatje Prize, 2015;
10 Minutes 38 Seconds in This Strange World, shortlisted for the Booker Prize, 2019;
10 Minutes 38 Seconds in This Strange World, shortlisted for Ondaatje Prize, 2020;
 The Island of Missing Trees, shortlisted for the Costa Book Award, 2021;
 Halldór Laxness International Literature Prize, 2021;
 The Island of Missing Trees, shortlisted for the Women's Prize for Fiction, 2022;

Other recognition

 Maria Grazia Cutuli Award – International Journalism Prize, Italy 2006.
 Turkish Journalists and Writers Foundation "The Art of Coexistence Award, 2009";
 Marka Conference 2010 Award;
 Women To Watch Award, Mediacat & Advertising Age, March 2014;
 Asian Women of Achievement Awards 2015: Global Empowerment Award;
 2016 GTF Awards for Excellence in Promoting Gender Equality;
 BBC's 100 most inspiring and influential women, 2021.

Bibliography

NOTE: Marion Boyars Publishers Ltd was bought out by Viking in 2011.

Notes

References

Further reading
 Kalpaklı, Fatma.  Amitav Ghosh ile Elif Şafak’ın Romanlarında Öteki/leştirme/Us and Them Attitude in the Works of Amitav Ghosh and Elif Şafak .   Konya: Çizgi Kitabevi, 2016.

External links

  – official site 
  – official site 
 Elif Shafak at Curtis Brown Literary and Talent Agency
 
 
 Elif Shafak's Istanbul, CNN International 
 Elif Shafak 'Read My Country', BBC Radio World Service The Strand 
 Urdu Translations of Elif Shafak's books, Jumhoori Publications
 Elif Shafak: 'In Turkey, men write and women read. I want to see this change'

1971 births
Living people
21st-century essayists
Academics of the University of Oxford
Bisexual women
Bisexual novelists
Exophonic writers
Free speech activists
Freedom of expression in Turkey
French people of Turkish descent
LGBT academics
Turkish LGBT novelists
Turkish bisexual people
Middle East Technical University alumni
New Statesman people
Writers from Ankara
Turkish academics
Turkish feminists
Turkish non-fiction writers
Turkish women novelists
Women political scientists
Turkish emigrants to the United Kingdom
University of Arizona faculty
BBC 100 Women